KNVA (channel 54) is a television station in Austin, Texas, United States, serving as a de facto owned-and-operated station of The CW. It is owned by Vaughan Media and operated under a local marketing agreement (LMA) by The CW's majority owner, Nexstar Media Group, making it sister to NBC affiliate KXAN-TV (channel 36) and Llano-licensed MyNetworkTV affiliate KBVO (channel 14). The stations share studios on West Martin Luther King Jr. Boulevard and San Gabriel Street (between the Old West Austin section of Austin and the University of Texas at Austin campus), while KNVA's transmitter is located at the West Austin Antenna Farm on Mount Larson (near Loop 360 and Westlake Drive, north of West Lake Hills).

History

Early history
The UHF channel 54 allocation in Austin was contested between three groups that competed for Federal Communications Commission (FCC) approval of a construction permit to build and license to operate a new television station. Capitol City Community Interests Inc. (headed by David L. Ferguson and owned by Allandale Baptist Church) filed the initial application on May 22, 1984; it proposed a family-oriented program lineup using fare from the American Christian Television System. Its application led to a stampede, and by the time the FCC had designated all of the applications for comparative hearing, there were nine different groups seeking the channel. These included ATV Associates, Balcones Broadcasting (majority-owned by Houston-based attorney Billy B. "Paz" Goldberg and chaired by local news anchor Ronnell H. "Ron" Oliveira), Capital City Community Interests, Capitol Area Broadcasting, Channel 54, Ltd., DB Broadcasting, Isabel Chávez, Lake Country Telecasters Inc., and Television 54 Corp. On September 3, 1985, Capital City Community Interests had its application dismissed with prejudice per a request to the FCC filed by Lake Country Telecasters.

In an administrative proceeding, FCC Administrative Law Judge Joseph Chachkin conditionally granted the permit to Balcones Broadcasting on July 10, 1986, denying the applications of Capital City Community Interests, Television 54 Corp., Capitol Area Broadcasting, ATV Associates and DB Broadcasting. The grant was conditioned on Billy Goldberg divesting his interests in NBC affiliate KVEO-TV in Brownsville (where Oliveira had become an assistant general manager in early 1985 and which Goldberg was in the process of acquiring at the time Balcones filed its application) and Odessa-based independent station KPEJ (now a Fox affiliate). Shortly after obtaining approval for the permit and license, Balcones Broadcasting chose to request KCFP as the planned television station's call letters. In the meantime, Oliveira returned to KVUE in 1987.

The original decision was affirmed on October 30, 1987, when the FCC approved a settlement agreement between the seven applicants and granted Balcones's amended application for UHF channel 54. Balcones' grant was subsequently challenged by Frontier Southwest Broadcasting Inc., only to be upheld on April 15, 1988 on grounds that denying the application in its favor would otherwise nullify Frontier's existing construction permit for a low-power station on UHF channel 55. On October 12, 1990, Balcones filed to sell the license to 54 Broadcasting Inc. (owned by Ron Oliveira and Billy Goldberg, along with Billy's wife, Rosalie Goldberg, and son Mark Goldberg of private equity firm Goldberg-Hirsch Ventures and a special assistant to the Texas State Comptroller at the time, and Mark Cohen and Mitchel Levy of LS Communications) for assumption of liabilities and payments to the Balcones partners to cover permit acquisition costs. The transfer received FCC approval 17 months later on March 26, 1992. Partly as a result of the sagging Texas economy caused by the oil bust of the late 1980s, the Goldberg-Oliveira consortium could not economically start up the station until it obtained financial backing from Houston-based investment firm 21st Century Corp. Aiding in helping 54 Broadcasting get the station on the air was LIN TV Corporation—then-owner of NBC affiliate KXAN-TV (channel 36)—with which the consortium entered into a local marketing agreement (LMA) in the spring of 1994, in which KXAN would provide technical, programming and advertising resources.

Channel 54—as KNVA (meaning "Nueva," in reference to the originally planned Spanish-language format)—began test broadcasts on August 24, 1994, in order to meet an FCC-required deadline to commence broadcasts by the end of that month to maintain the license. The station formally signed on the air one week later on August 31 (one week before Oliveira left his role as KVUE weeknight co-anchor to focus on managing KNVA). It was originally formatted as a 24-hour weather forecast service—with content selected by the on-duty meteorologist—that featured loops of Doppler radar and satellite imagery, current conditions from KXAN's live weather observation network (along with maps detailing actual and apparent temperatures, and wind speeds within the viewing area), area lake levels, pollen counts, and local and regional forecasts as well as live and pre-recorded forecast segments presented by KXAN-TV's meteorologists. The format—which included breakaways for brief commercial breaks and customary station identifications—could also allow KNVA to provide supplementary live coverage from the KXAN weather staff in severe weather situations that did not warrant extended coverage on Channel 36.

Amid a network realignment caused by New World Communications' affiliation agreement with Fox (which planned to move its programming to CBS affiliate KTBC-TV) and the launches of the United Paramount Network (UPN, a joint venture between Paramount Television and Chris-Craft/United Television) and The WB (a venture between Time Warner and Tribune Broadcasting), 54 Broadcasting considered making bids for the affiliation rights to either CBS or UPN. However, CBS would sign a contract with outgoing Fox affiliate KBVO-TV (which changed its call letters to KEYE-TV upon joining the network in July 1995), as it had been longer established. Meanwhile, KNVA managing partner LIN TV acquired the UPN affiliation, but opted to carry the network on seven low-power repeaters of KXAN. Instead, on November 10, 1994, KNVA signed an agreement to become a charter affiliate of The WB.

As a WB affiliate
On January 9, 1995, KNVA switched to a family-oriented general entertainment programming format, with program selections made based on suggestions from Central Texas residents; it originally carried a mix of classic and some recent off-network sitcoms and drama series, some feature films, first-run syndicated programs (including reality-based lifestyle and documentary programs and some scripted series), animated series, rebroadcasts of KXAN's local newscasts and a limited amount of Spanish-language programming. (Oliveira and his partners in the former Balcones Broadcasting originally considered operating Channel 54 as a Spanish-language outlet when the group submitted its initial application for the license, citing the lack of such an existing station in Austin even though the Hispanic/Latino populace accounted for roughly 25% of the area's total population.) Two days later on January 11, the station became a charter affiliate of The WB. Similar to other WB-affiliated stations of the period, KNVA—which initially branded as "KNVA 54"—filled the 7:00 to 9:00 p.m. time slot with first-run and off-network syndicated programs as The WB had only maintained a lineup of prime time programs on Wednesday nights at launch; this would become less of an issue as The WB launched additional nights of programming over the next four years, adopting a six-night weekly schedule in September 1999 (running Sunday through Fridays). By September 1995, KNVA began incorporating some series onto its schedule that KEYE was forced to vacate from its inventory to make room for the heavy amount of network programming brought on by its new CBS affiliation.

KNVA gradually evolved its programming slate during the late 1990s, scaling back many of the classic sitcom reruns that populated its schedule and shifting its focus more towards a lineup consisting primarily of family-oriented sitcoms and first-run talk shows during the daytime hours, and more recent sitcoms and first-run and off-network drama series as well as select reality series at night. In September 2001, the station changed its on-air branding to "Austin's WB 54". By 2002, court shows and additional talk and reality series had been added to the schedule, while animated programs carried on KNVA's schedule were relegated to those coming from Kids' WB; it became the last station in the market that continued to run cartoons on weekday afternoons until the weekday edition of the block was discontinued by The WB in January 2006, when the network replaced it with the Daytime WB rerun block (which would evolve into The CW Daytime).

Between March and September 2003, the station acquired a few syndicated shows that had been displaced from low-power independent station K13VC (channel 13) after it was forced off the air to make room for the digital signal of Killeen-licensed Univision owned-and-operated station KAKW-TV (channel 62), which had just moved into Austin the preceding year. KNVA switched to identifying as simply "Austin's WB" in September 2003, amid a growing trend among Austin's UHF television stations of reducing their dependence on referencing their over-the-air channel allocation due to the high cable penetration rate within the market in order to receive UHF signals that were otherwise impaired by the Hill Country's rugged terrain.

As a (primary) CW affiliate
On January 24, 2006, the Warner Bros. Entertainment division of Time Warner and CBS Corporation announced that they would launch The CW Television Network, a joint venture that initially featured programs carried over from The WB and UPN—which Time Warner and CBS, respectively, would shut down in concurrence with the new network's launch—as well as new series specifically produced for The CW. Subsequently, on February 22, News Corporation announced the launch of MyNetworkTV, a venture between its Fox Television Stations and Twentieth Television units that was created to primarily to provide a network programming option for UPN and WB stations not chosen for charter affiliation by The CW (which, in markets where the two predecessor networks were carried on separate broadcast stations, chose its initial affiliates based on the highest viewership average between the local WB and UPN outlets).

At first, those moves put KNVA's future in doubt, as The CW and Corridor Television announced on March 28, that it had signed an agreement to affiliate the network with Fredericksburg-based UPN affiliate KBEJ (channel 2, now MyNetworkTV affiliate KCWX, a callsign that station adopted prior to joining The CW in August 2006). However, even though it had been serving as the Austin market's de facto UPN affiliate since K13VC abruptly disaffiliated from that network in October 2000, KBEJ/KCWX serves—and its city of license is considered part of—the San Antonio market (to its adjacent south). As such, KNVA's only options would have been either to join MyNetworkTV or default to operating as an independent station. But in a surprise move on April 18, LIN TV—as part of an affiliation deal that also consigned sister stations WWHO in Columbus, Ohio, WNLO in Buffalo, New York and WFNA in Mobile, Alabama to join the network—announced that KNVA would serve as The CW's Austin charter affiliate. Even if KCWX's de facto dual-market status was not a factor, there was a likelihood that KNVA would have been chosen to join The CW in any event as—even though Austin had been large enough to support six commercial English-language television stations since the late 1980s—the Austin market lacked a sixth full-power commercial station at the time, which would have left a subchannel-only affiliation with one of the market's Big Four network stations as the network's only other viable option. As a result of both stations choosing to affiliate with The CW, KCWX management decided to re-target that station exclusively towards the San Antonio market. To comply with FCC restrictions on network duplication by cable providers, Time Warner Cable (which had its franchise rights acquired by Charter Spectrum in 2016, via its merger with Charter Communications) began blacking out CW programming carried over KCWX within its Austin service area effective October 1, 2006; it continued to transmit KCWX's syndicated and paid programming until April 3, 2007, when the provider officially removed the station from its Austin-area lineup.

Over a week after the CW affiliation announcement, on April 26, 2006, LIN—as part of a separate contract also covering sister stations WNDY-TV in Indianapolis, WCTX in Hartford–New Haven and WXSP-CD in Grand Rapids—announced that KNVA would also become a charter outlet of MyNetworkTV, offering its programming on a secondary basis. To date, KNVA was one of two American television stations carrying affiliations with both The CW and MyNetworkTV (the other being KWKB in Iowa City, Iowa, which would also drop MyNetworkTV and become an exclusive CW affiliate in September 2011). Until 2016, fellow MyNetworkTV charter stations WKTC in Columbia, South Carolina and WPWR-TV in Chicago (the latter serving as an O&O of the service) added primary CW affiliations while retaining a secondary MyNetworkTV affiliation over their main channels. On August 1, a video posted to the KNVA/KXAN shared website revealed the station would be officially branded as "The CW Austin," with MyNetworkTV programming branded as "MyNetworkTV on The CW Austin".

KNVA affiliated with MyNetworkTV upon that network's September 5 launch. Channel 54 remained a primary affiliate of The WB until that network ceased operations in September 17, and subsequently affiliated with The CW when it debuted the following day (September 18). During prime time, KNVA initially carried programming from both networks each weeknight (with The CW's prime time schedule airing in pattern from 7:00 to 9:00 p.m. and MyNetworkTV programming carried on a two-hour delay from 9:00 to 11:00 p.m.). As the two networks did not have overlapping prime time schedules on weekend evenings, KNVA exclusively carried MyNetworkTV programs on Saturdays and exclusively carried CW programs on Sundays.

On July 27, 2009, as part of the settlement of a lawsuit brought by the original majority shareholders, Decatur, Illinois–based Vaughan Media (owned by media executive Thomas J. Vaughan) acquired a 95.5% majority stake in 54 Broadcasting, Inc. from Oliveira, LS Communications and Goldberg-Hirsch Ventures for $6 million. LIN TV continued to hold a 4.5% stake in the station thereafter, which was forwarded to the eventual acquirers of LIN's former assets. On October 21 of that year, Llano-based sister station KBVO—which had been serving as a semi-satellite of KXAN (as KLNO and later, KXAM-TV) since it signed on in September 1991—adopted a separate entertainment schedule, assuming the MyNetworkTV affiliation rights for the Austin market from KNVA. This left Channel 54 exclusively affiliated with The CW, with syndicated programs—including some first-run and off-network series whose rights had been held by KNVA—being moved to KBVO to fill that station's new general-entertainment-based schedule; other syndicated shows were moved to new timeslots or added to KNVA's schedule to fill the former MyNetworkTV-occupied time slot on Monday through Friday evenings.

On March 21, 2014, Richmond, Virginia–based Media General announced that it would purchase the LIN Media stations, including KXAN-TV, KBVO (which it retained through the renewal of a satellite relay waiver that predated the termination of its KXAN simulcast to comply with FCC rules that prohibited legal duopolies in markets with fewer than eight independent full-power television station owners), and the LMA with and 4.5-percent stake in KNVA, in a $1.6 billion merger. The FCC approved the merger on December 12, 2014, with the deal being consummated on December 19.

On January 27, 2016, Irving-based Nexstar Broadcasting Group – which had a previous $14.50-per-share offer for the group be rejected two months earlier – announced that it would acquire Media General for an evaluation of $4.6 billion in cash and stock plus the assumption of $2.3 billion in Media General-held debt, in exchange for giving right of first refusal to the Meredith Corporation to acquire any divested broadcast or digital properties (a clause that Meredith did not exercise) as compensation for terminating a prior $2.4-billion acquisition agreement it reached with Media General the previous September to accept Nexstar's counterbid. The transaction was approved by the FCC on January 11, 2017; the sale was completed six days later on January 17, at which point the existing Nexstar stations and the former Media General outlets that were not subject to divestiture to address ownership conflicts in certain overlapping markets became part of the renamed Nexstar Media Group. The deal marked Nexstar's re-entry into the Austin market, as the group had previously operated CBS affiliate KEYE-TV (channel 42) under a local marketing agreement with Four Points Media Group from 2009 to 2011, concluding after Sinclair Broadcast Group acquired the KEYE and the other Four Points stations.

Subchannel history

KNVA-DT2
KNVA-DT2 is the Grit-affiliated second digital subchannel of KNVA, broadcasting in standard definition on UHF channel 23.2 (or virtual channel 54.2).

KNVA originally launched a digital subchannel on virtual channel 54.2 on September 27, 2010, originally maintaining a standard-definition test simulcast of the station's primary channel. On October 25, 2010, KNVA-DT2 converted into an affiliate of TheCoolTV, as a result of then-parent LIN Media having signed a deal with Cool Music Network LLC to carry the music video network on the group's stations in eleven of the 17 markets where it operated stations at the time; LIN dropped the network from KNVA and its sister stations elsewhere in the U.S. – and decommissioned the 54.2 subchannel – on February 28, 2013.

On November 16, 2015, Media General announced that it had reached an agreement with Katz Broadcasting to affiliate 16 stations owned and/or operated by the group — including KNVA — with one or more of three Katz-owned multicast networks, Laff, Escape and Grit. As part of the agreement, on January 29, 2016, KNVA relaunched its DT2 subchannel to serve as an affiliate of Grit.

KNVA-DT3
KNVA-DT3 is the Laff-affiliated third digital subchannel of KNVA, broadcasting in standard definition on UHF channel 23.3 (or virtual channel 54.3). On January 29, 2016, as part of Media General's agreement with Katz, KNVA launched a digital subchannel on virtual channel 54.3 to serve as an affiliate of Laff. (Under the initial agreement, the Laff affiliation rights in the Austin market originally intended to be assigned to a subchannel of KBVO.)

KNVA-DT4
KNVA-DT4 is the Ion Mystery-affiliated fourth digital subchannel of KNVA, broadcasting in standard definition on UHF channel 23.4 (or virtual channel 54.4). The subchannel is not carried on the market's cable systems as Court TV Mystery already holds local cable carriage rights through its secondary Austin affiliate, Killeen-licensed Univision O&O KAKW-DT (channel 62), which carries the network on its DT4 subchannel. (Katz Broadcasting's affiliation agreements for Court TV Mystery and its sister networks are structured as non-exclusive subchannel leases, resulting in certain Katz networks being carried on more than one station in certain markets such as Austin.)

On October 13, 2017, as part of a June 2016 agreement between Nexstar Media Group and Katz Broadcasting to affiliate 81 stations (aside from those covered by the Media General agreement that preceded Nexstar's purchase of the group) with one or more of Katz's four multicast networks, KNVA launched a digital subchannel on virtual channel 54.4 to serve as an affiliate of Escape. The subchannel's branding changed to Court TV Mystery on September 29, 2019.

Programming
KNVA currently carries the entire CW network schedule (consisting of its nightly prime time schedule and its customary Saturday morning educational program block, One Magnificent Morning), offering its programming in pattern. Syndicated programs broadcast by KNVA include Maury, The Steve Wilkos Show, The People's Court, The Goldbergs, Black-ish, Mom and Family Feud.

The station also broadcasts three locally produced entertainment programs that air as part of KNVA's weekend schedule: Expedition Texas (a travel and tourism program), YOLO, Texas (a similarly formatted program focusing on unique "bucket list" attractions) and 512 Studios Live (a weekly music showcase featuring performances by local bands).

KNVA served as the flagship station for Austin FC in the 2021 season. This ended in 2022 after Major League Soccer signed a 10-year broadcasting deal with Apple Inc. to air MLS matches on MLS Season Pass.

Newscasts

, KXAN-TV presently produces six hours of locally produced newscasts each week for KNVA (consisting of one hour on weekdays and a half-hour each on Saturdays and Sundays); in addition, KXAN also produces KXAN Sports: More Than the Score, a 15-minute sports highlight program (hosted by KXAN sports director Roger Wallace, sports anchor/reporters Chris Tavarez and Andrew Schnitker, and KNVA entertainment reporter Joe Barlow) that airs as part of its weeknight 9:00 p.m. news block. In addition to airing local newscasts produced by KXAN-TV, channel 54 also will take on the responsibility of simulcasting severe weather coverage from its parent station in place of regular programming in the event that a tornado warning is issued for any part of the station's main over-the-air broadcast area.

Newscast history
When KNVA converted into an entertainment format on January 9, 1995, the station carried rebroadcasts of KXAN's weekday morning, 6:00 and 10:00 p.m. newscasts on a one hour (for the evening newscasts) to 90-minute delay (for the morning newscasts). Since the conversion, channel 54 has aired regularly scheduled weather updates presented by the KXAN weather staff that air at the top of each hour for most of the broadcast day. (The looping weather programming that had encompassed its entire schedule since its August 1994 launch was concurrently relegated to a daily overnight block from 2:00 to 6:00 a.m.; this block was discontinued in September 1998, when KNVA began offering a simulcast of the Shop at Home Network during that time period.)

On October 16, 1995, KXAN-TV began producing a half-hour early evening newscast at 5:30 p.m. for KNVA, The 5:30 Report. Originally co-anchored by KNVA principal owner and general manager Ron Oliveira (who, following his departure from a similar role at ABC affiliate KVUE, became lead weeknight co-anchor at KXAN that spring) and Leslie Cook (who joined KXAN that fall, after serving as an anchor/reporter at ABC affiliate KHBS/KHOG in Fort Smith–Fayetteville, Arkansas) alongside field anchor Robert Hadlock (who was reassigned to that position with Oliveira's hiring, before resuming in-studio anchor duties on KXAN's 10:00 p.m. newscast that fall), KXAN chief meteorologist Jim Spencer and sports director Roger Wallace, the weeknight-only program was produced out of a dedicated set within a secondary soundstage at KXAN's Martin Luther King Jr. Boulevard studios. It directly competed against KTBC's existing 5:00 p.m. newscast, which had expanded to one hour to become the Austin market's first local newscast to be offered in the 5:30 time slot on July 3, as a byproduct of the affiliation switch from CBS to Fox that occurred the day prior. The program experienced low viewership throughout its two-year run, unable to compete with national network newscasts on KVUE, KXAN and KEYE and syndicated entertainment programs on independent station K13VC in the timeslot; The 5:30 Report was cancelled and discontinued after the edition of June 8, 1997, to be replaced on June 11 by syndicated reruns of Hangin' with Mr. Cooper. (Oliveira would remain at KXAN until March 1999, when he left to become chief operating officer at upstart Telemundo affiliate KTLM in McAllen.)

Locally produced newscasts returned to channel 54 after an eleven-year absence on September 21, 2009, when KXAN debuted a nightly prime time newscast at 9:00 p.m. for Channel 54, titled KXAN News at 9:00 on The CW Austin. Originally debuting as a half-hour program, it became the competitor to KTBC's in-house 9:00 p.m. newscast, a one-hour program which has been the leader in the time period since it launched in August 2000. The weeknight editions of the newscast would eventually be expanded to 45 minutes on September 21, 2015, although the weekend editions remain a half-hour in length. Filling the remainder of the timeslot on weeknights following the expansion was ), a local news satire show hosted by Austin-based comedian Brian Gaar (a half-hour "best of" edition aired on Saturdays following the 9:00 p.m. newscast). The program was discontinued on July 1, 2016, citing low viewership; reruns of ) continued to air until September 2, 2016, to be replaced three days later (September 5) by KXAN Sports: More Than the Score, a panel analysis program focusing primarily on college and high school sports that features the KXAN sports department staff, Austin American-Statesman sportswriters and hosts from sports radio station KTXX-FM (104.9).

On September 3, 2013, KXAN began producing a two-hour extension of its weekday morning newscast for the station, under the title KXAN News Today on The CW Austin, running from 7:00 to 9:00 a.m. In addition to airing opposite Today on KXAN as well as competing national morning news programs on KVUE and KEYE-TV, the program – which utilized the same staff as the parent 4:30 to 7:00 a.m. newscast on KXAN – directly competed against the third and fourth full hours of Fox O&O KTBC's in-house morning newscast, which expanded into the time period upon Channel 7's 1995 switch from CBS to Fox. In addition to news headlines, weather forecasts and traffic reports, the program also featured entertainment news and updates on trending news stories from the KXAN website staff. On September 8, 2014, the KNVA broadcast of KXAN News Today was expanded to include a simulcast of the newscast's 6:00 a.m. hour that had previously been exclusive to KXAN. Although it had launched an in-house news department two days prior, on July 17, 2017, Fox-affiliated sister station KWKT-TV in Waco began carrying a simulcast of KNVA's morning program (which it branded as Fox 44 Capital News) in lieu of a KWKT-produced local newscast. The KXAN News Today extension was discontinued after the August 24, 2018, broadcast, after having suffered from insufficient viewership for most of its run, although KNVA continues to simulcast the 6:00 a.m. hour of KXAN's morning newscast; KNVA replaced the newscast with a two-hour repeat block of KXAN's midday lifestyle program, Studio 512. (In the Waco–Temple–Bryan market, KWKT replaced the KNVA simulcast with syndicated educational children's programs and infomercials.)

Technical information

Subchannels
The station's digital signal is multiplexed:

ATSC 3.0 channels
KNVA started ATSC 3.0 simulcasts on KBVO-CD on October 7, 2020 as KNVA-CD.

Analog-to-digital conversion and spectrum repack
KNVA shut down its analog signal on June 12, 2009, as part of the FCC-mandated transition to digital television for full-power stations. The station's digital signal remained on its pre-transition UHF channel 49, using PSIP to display KNVA's virtual channel as 54 on digital television receivers, which was among the high band UHF channels (52-69) that were removed from broadcasting use as a result of the transition.

As a part of the broadcast frequency repacking process following the 2016-2017 FCC incentive auction, KNVA relocated its digital signal from UHF channel 49 to UHF 23 on June 21, 2019.

Translators
KNVA is rebroadcast on five digital Class A translator stations across Central Texas – all owned by Nexstar Media Group and utilizing call signs that reference their former alliance under the defunct Hill Country Paramount Network service – located in communities surrounding Austin:

Former translators

The five repeaters were put on the air in the early 1990s, initially as rebroadcasters of KXAN to improve reception in the Hill Country, alongside two stations that were later deleted: KHPG-CA channel 31 in Giddings (closed in 2011) and KHPB-CD channel 45 in Bastrop (canceled in 2017). In 1995, these stations became a separate entity, the "Hill Country Paramount Network" (also known as "HPN"), which simulcast KNVA's programming but substituted UPN prime time and network shows for those of The WB. The main station for Austin viewers was K49CY, which moved to channel 51 in the summer of 1995 and became KBVO-LP (later KBVO-CA and today KBVO-CD, Austin's ATSC 3.0 multiplex).

In 1998, the Hill Country Paramount Network—without cable carriage—lost its network affiliation on six days' notice to K13VC "KVC", which was on Austin cable systems.

From January 14, 2002, until the fall of 2008, the translator network served as a simulcast of KBVO-CA, which operated as an affiliate of fledgling Spanish-language network Telefutura during this period. When KBVO-CA disaffiliated from Telefutura after parent Univision Communications migrated the network to its owned-and-operated KTFO-CA (channel 31), KBVO-CA and its former repeaters were converted into full-time rebroadcasters of KNVA. KBVO-CA split away when the MyNetworkTV station was established in 2009.

References

External links

The CW affiliates
Grit (TV network) affiliates
Laff (TV network) affiliates
Ion Mystery affiliates
Television channels and stations established in 1994
NVA
Nexstar Media Group
1994 establishments in Texas